Ōmāpere is a settlement on the south shore of Hokianga Harbour in Northland, New Zealand. State Highway 12 runs through Ōmāpere. Opononi is on the shore to the north of Ōmāpere.

History

European settlement
The first European settler in the Ōmāpere area was John Martin, who arrived in the Hokianga Harbour in 1827. In 1832 Martin purchased land on the flat area, along the beach at Ōmāpere. In 1838 Martin extended his land purchase to the Hokianga Harbour's South Head, where he established a signal station to guide ships crossing the challenging harbour entrance. The signal station remained in operation until 1951.

With permission from Ngāti Korokoro, the local hapū  (sub-tribe), in 1838 John Whiteley established a Wesleyan mission at Pākanae on land purchased with blankets, tools and tobacco.

In 1869, a bush licence was granted to Charles Bryers at Ōmāpere. In the mid 1870s, a liquor licence was then given to the establishment called the 'Heads'. This later became the 'Travellers Rest'. By 1876 the farm of John Martin had become the township of Pakia. It was home to a hotel, two stores, several houses and a school house. The name Ōmāpere began to be used more frequently and became Ōmāpere by residents agreement in 1874. By the latter 19th century, Ōmāpere became an important location for the kauri gum digging trade.

Marae
Waiwhatawhata or Aotea Marae and Te Kaiwaha meeting house are affiliated to Ngāti Korokoro and Ngāti Whārara.

Demographics
Statistics New Zealand describes Ōmāpere as a rural settlement. The settlement is part of the larger Waipoua Forest statistical area.

Ōmāpere had a population of 426 at the 2018 New Zealand census, an increase of 63 people (17.4%) since the 2013 census, and an increase of 33 people (8.4%) since the 2006 census. There were 180 households, comprising 192 males and 234 females, giving a sex ratio of 0.82 males per female, with 93 people (21.8%) aged under 15 years, 60 (14.1%) aged 15 to 29, 150 (35.2%) aged 30 to 64, and 120 (28.2%) aged 65 or older.

Ethnicities were 52.1% European/Pākehā, 63.4% Māori, 4.2% Pacific peoples, and 2.1% Asian. People may identify with more than one ethnicity.

Although some people chose not to answer the census's question about religious affiliation, 40.1% had no religion, 46.5% were Christian, 4.2% had Māori religious beliefs and 0.7% were Hindu.

Of those at least 15 years old, 51 (15.3%) people had a bachelor's or higher degree, and 69 (20.7%) people had no formal qualifications. 27 people (8.1%) earned over $70,000 compared to 17.2% nationally. The employment status of those at least 15 was that 81 (24.3%) people were employed full-time, 75 (22.5%) were part-time, and 21 (6.3%) were unemployed.

Notes

References

Hokianga
Populated places in the Northland Region
Kauri gum